Ecstasy may refer to:

 Ecstasy (emotion), a trance or trance-like state in which a person transcends normal consciousness
 Religious ecstasy, a state of consciousness, visions or absolute euphoria
 Ecstasy (philosophy), to be or stand outside oneself
 Ecstasy (drug), colloquial term for MDMA in tablet form, an empathogenic drug

Arts and entertainment

Literature
 Ecstasy: Three Tales of Chemical Romance, a 1996 collection of three novellas by Irvine Welsh
 Ecstasies (book), a 1989 book by Carlo Ginzburg
 Ecstasy (comics), a super villain in the Marvel Comics Universe
 "The Ecstasy", a poem by John Donne

Music

Bands
 XTC, an English band, pronounced as X-T-C

Albums
 Ecstasy (Avant album), 2002
 Ecstasy (Deuter album), 1979
 Ecstasy (Kissin' Dynamite album), 2018
 Ecstasy (Lou Reed album), 2000
 Ecstasy (My Bloody Valentine album), 1987
 Ecstasy (Ohio Players album), 1973
 Ecstasy (Steve Kuhn album), 1975

Songs
 "Ecstasy" (ATB song), by ATB on his 2004 album No Silence
 "Ecstasy", by Bone Thugs-N-Harmony on their 2000 album BTNHResurrection
 "Ecstasy", by Eric Burdon on his 1980 album Darkness Darkness
 "Ecstasy", by Crooked Still on their 2005 album Shaken by a Low Sound
 "Ecstasy", by Danity Kane on their 2008 album Welcome to the Dollhouse
 "Ecstasy", by D-Complex, released for the 2002 music video game Dance Dance Revolution Extreme
 "Ecstasy", by Iceage on their 2013 album You're Nothing
 "Ecstasy", by jj on their 2009 album jj n° 2
 "Ecstasy" (Koda Kumi song), on her 2009 album 3 Splash
 "Ecstasy", by Megadeth on their 1999 album Risk
 "Ecstasy" (New Order song), on their 1983 album Power, Corruption & Lies
 "Ecstasy", by Dolores O'Riordan on her 2007 debut solo album Are You Listening?
 "Ecstasy", by Doc Pomus and Phil Spector, recorded by Ben E. King in 1962
 "Ecstasy", by the Raspberries on their 1973 album Side 3
 "Ecstasy", by The Stripes in 1979
 "Ecstasy" (Jody Watley song), by Jody Watley from her 1993 album Intimacy
 "Ecstasy", by zZz in 2003
 "Ecstasy", by young thug from his 2019 album So Much Fun

Other media
 Ecstasy (film), a 1933 Czech film starring Hedy Lamarr and directed by Gustav Machatý
 Ecstasy (play), a 1979 play by Mike Leigh
 Ecstasy (Gill sculpture), a 1911 relief sculpture by Eric Gill
 Irvine Welsh's Ecstasy, a 2011 film based on Irvine Welsh's third novella, The Undefeated

Other uses
 Carnival Ecstasy, previously known as Ecstasy, a cruise ship operated by Carnival Cruise Lines
 Ecstasy (clothing), a fashion brand based in Bangladesh

See also
 
 
 "Extacy" (Kanye West song)
 Extasy Records, a record label
 XTC (disambiguation)
 Ekstasis (disambiguation)